(lit. "Soap Bubbles") is a Japanese nursery rhyme written by Ujō Noguchi in 1922. It is widely taught in Japanese nursery schools and kindergartens as a simple melody; it is also sometimes used in elementary school moral education courses, where students learn that it is a meditation on the death of a child.

Noguchi's daughter Midori died at the age of just 7 days in 1908. In the Meiji period, the infant mortality rate was quite high and 20 to 30 percent of children died before reaching schooling age. It was common to have many children to aim for success of the household, but Noguchi was divorced, and he thus mourned the loss of his only child for a long time.

It is widely believed that Noguchi, seeing the girls in his village play with bubbles, was reminded of the brief existence of his daughter, and wrote this poem on that occasion. However, other than the above facts, the direct inspiration for the song is unknown.

The tune is a modification of the Christian hymn "Jesus Loves Me, This I Know".

It is used as the melody for departing trains in Yumoto Station, Iwaki, Fukushima Prefecture.

Melody and lyrics

References

External links
 Performance at Toyama University
Hiroshima Piano (2020 film) (official website)

1922 songs
Japanese children's songs
Japanese-language songs
Japanese nursery rhymes